Bernard Fernandez may refer to:
 Bernard Fernandez (baseball)
 Bernard Fernandez (cyclist)
 Bernard Fernandez (journalist)